At about 2 a.m. on December 8, 1922, a fire began which destroyed up to 30 blocks in central Astoria, Oregon. Approximately 2,500 residents lost their homes, with one death, and damages exceeded hundreds of millions of dollars. The fire is considered to be one of the worst in Oregon's history.

A 1922 report attributed:

Astoria had major fires in July 1883 and December 16, 2010.

References

External links
 Astoria Fire - December 7, 1922, Puget Sound Theatre Organ Society

1922 in Oregon
1922 fires in the United States
Astoria, Oregon
Fires in Oregon
History of Oregon